Zoulu culture [邹鲁(文化)] means lands of cultural prosperity. During Spring and Autumn Period and Warring States Period, the Zoulu area, due to rich relics of Yin and Dongyi cultures, and also influences from Zhou culture alone, formed a strong cultural atmosphere.

State of Lu was hometown to Confucius and state of Zou was the hometown of Mencius. In this ancient land, many thinkers such as Yanzi, ancient craftsman Lu Ban, Zengzi, Zisi and Mozi came to this fertile soil. Their ancestors were here since prehistoric times.

Quote

There is a quote from Mencius - Liang Hui Wang II, 19 (孟子 - 梁惠王下, 19):

鄒與魯鬨。穆公問曰：「吾有司死者三十三人，而民莫之死也。誅之，則不可勝誅；不誅，則疾視其長上之死而不救，如之何則可也？」

孟子對曰：「凶年饑歲，君之民老弱轉乎溝壑，壯者散而之四方者，幾千人矣；而君之倉廩實，府庫充，有司莫以告，是上慢而殘下也。曾子曰：『戒之戒之！出乎爾者，反乎爾者也。』夫民今而後得反之也。君無尤焉。君行仁政，斯民親其上、死其長矣。」

References

Cultural history of China
Cultural Revolution
Social movements